Antje Buschschulte (born 27 December 1978 in Berlin) is a former German swimmer. Her best disciplines were the short distance backstroke and freestyle races. Buschschulte swam for the sporting club SC Magdeburg. She participated in Olympic Games 1996, 2000, 2004, 2008 and won 5 olympic bronze medals. She was World Champion in 100m backstroke 2003 in Barcelona. In total Antje won 57 international medals (Olympic Games, World Championships, European Championships). She is the only German swimmer who participated for 14 years in a row (1995–2008) in every major longcourse championship (Olympic Games, World Championships, European Championships).

Antje holds a diploma in neurobiology from the Otto-von-Guericke-University in Magdeburg and currently works as head of the office for State Minister Rainer Robra in the State Chancellery of Saxony-Anhalt.

She lives with her husband Helge Meeuw and her daughters in Magdeburg.

See also
 List of German records in swimming

References

External links
 
 

1978 births
Living people
Swimmers from Berlin
German female swimmers
German female freestyle swimmers
German female backstroke swimmers
Swimmers at the 1996 Summer Olympics
Swimmers at the 2000 Summer Olympics
Swimmers at the 2004 Summer Olympics
Swimmers at the 2008 Summer Olympics
Olympic swimmers of Germany
Olympic bronze medalists for Germany
Olympic bronze medalists in swimming
World Aquatics Championships medalists in swimming
Medalists at the FINA World Swimming Championships (25 m)
European Aquatics Championships medalists in swimming
Medalists at the 2004 Summer Olympics
Medalists at the 2000 Summer Olympics
Medalists at the 1996 Summer Olympics